Nigel William Bradshaw (born 8 May 1951 in Camberley, Surrey) is a British-born actor, who is best known for his role as in the Australian television series Prisoner as Officer Dennis Cruickshank

Career
Bradshaw apart from appearing in Prisoner, played Samuel Povey in the (BBC Television) adaptation of Arnold Bennett's The Old Wives' Tale, renamed for television as Sophia and Constance. In the late 1980s he also had a small role in the British soap opera, Brookside and followed this with a cameo in the Granada TV series, Coasting in 1990 and Peak Practice in 1998.

Filmography

External links

Australian male film actors
Australian male soap opera actors
Living people
1951 births
Actors from Coventry
Male actors from Warwickshire
20th-century Australian male actors
21st-century Australian male actors